Jaebetz is a village and a former municipality in the Mecklenburgische Seenplatte district, in Mecklenburg-Vorpommern, Germany. Since 1 January 2010, it is part of the municipality Fincken.

Villages in Mecklenburg-Western Pomerania